Daishi Nobuyuki (born 23 August 1968 as Nobuyuki Takano) is a former sumo wrestler from Hitachi, Ibaraki, Japan. He made his professional debut in March 1984, and reached the top division in July 1994. His highest rank was maegashira 3. He retired in March 2002 and remained in the Sumo Association as jun-toshiyori before leaving in June 2003. He is now a professional singer.

Career
He joined Oshiogawa stable in March 1984 after completing junior high school. Fighting under his own surname of Takano, he weighed 114 kg in his debut but he struggled to adapt and his weight dropped to 98 kg by November 1985. He rose slowly up the ranks, adopting the shikona of Daishi in 1987 and steadily increasing his weight to 143 kg by 1992, around average.  In May 1993 after nine years in sumo he finally reached sekitori status upon promotion to the juryo division. He reached the top makuuchi division in July 1994. He fought in the top division for 23 tournaments, compiling a record of 145 wins against 191 losses, but never managed to win a special prize or defeat a yokozuna. His highest rank was maegashira 3, which he reached in July 1996. He was demoted from makuuchi in July 1997, but managed to return in September 2000 after three years in juryo. He retired in March 2002 after a 3–12 record at juryo 9 left him facing demotion to makushita.

Retirement from sumo

He remained in sumo as Daishi Oyakata under the jun-toshiyori system, working as a coach at Oshiogawa stable. With his stablemaster, former ozeki Daikirin, due to reach the mandatory retirement age in 2007 it was thought Daishi might be in line to take over the running of the stable. However, he left the Sumo Association in June 2003, ahead of the two year grace period he had to acquire a permanent toshiyori, to launch a career as a professional singer. He had been allowed by the Sumo Association to record a CD and sing at danpatsu-shiki, but only jinku music.  He continued to sing to the audience at retirement ceremonies, such as  yokozuna Takanohana's in 2003, ozeki Musoyama's in 2005, and Wakatenro’s in 2011. He produced a jinku CD by active top division wrestler Ikioi in 2012. He auditioned for the role of the Genie in Aladdin in 2014.

Fighting style
Daishi favoured yotsu-sumo (grappling techniques), preferring a migi-yotsu (right hand inside, left hand outside) grip on his opponent's mawashi. His most common winning kimarite was a straightforward yori-kiri, or force out.

Career record

See also
Glossary of sumo terms
List of past sumo wrestlers

References

External links

Official website

1968 births
Living people
Japanese sumo wrestlers
Sumo people from Ibaraki Prefecture
People from Hitachi, Ibaraki